Tawfiq al-Suwaidi (11 May 1892 – 15 October 1968) was an Iraqi politician who served as the prime minister of Iraq on three occasions stretching from 1929 to 1950.

Early life and education
Al-Suwaidi was born in Baghdad in 1892, he completed his early schooling at 16 and after a year in the local law college, travelled to Istanbul in 1909 where he continued his studies in the Istanbul College of Law. After completing his studies in Istanbul (graduation 1912) Tawfiq al-Suwaidi's was sent to the Sorbonne in Paris, by his father, to further his Law education. Al - Suwaidi returned to Iraq after finishing his studies in Paris in 1914. He joined the Ministry of Education as a secretary to the committee for the renovation of Shamsuddin Sami's famous French-Turkish Dictionary.

Career
During the first world war, as well as working as a lawyer, Al -Suwaidi worked as a teacher in the Law college in Damascus, teaching Roman and general international law. He accepted these posts after rejecting a judgeship in Dair al - Zor and resigning from a judgeship in Damascus - al-Suwaidi was adamant to take a professional salary paying position rather than a position of prestige in order to repay his father for his European education.

It was in 1928, upon the resignation of the Saadan ministry, that Tawfik al- Sowaidi was appointed premier and called to form his first cabinet. He thus became the youngest premier in Iraq's history.

Iraq was granted membership to the League of Nations in 1932 and due to his fluency in foreign languages, particularly French, the then diplomatic language, Tawfiq al-suwaidi was chosen as Iraq's first permanent representative.

In addition to serving as prime minister, Al-Suwaidi also held posts as the Minister of Foreign Affairs, the Minister of Justice, the Controller general of state accounts; and separate from his ministerial roles, al-Suwaidi served as a member of the regency council (performing the duties of king or regent at times in which they were absent from the country), a leader of the Iraqi delegation to the league of nations and a leader of the delegation to the united nations. He was elected as the president of the Chamber of Deputies from November 1929 to November 1930.

He was Governor of the Central Bank of Iraq from 1948 to 1949.

In 1958, Tawfiq al-Suwaidi was selected as the Foreign affairs minister under Arab Federation. However, this post was dissolved when the royal regime fell by the 14 July Revolution.

Because of his close ties to the crown, Suwaidi was arrested in 1958 during the revolution that overthrew the monarchy. Sentenced to life in prison, he was pardoned in 1961 and went into exile in Lebanon, where he died.

References

 Harris M. Lentz III, Heads of States and Governments: A Worldwide Encyclopedia of Over 2,300 Leaders, 1945 through 1992. McFarland & Company, Inc., 1994, p. 411. .

1892 births
1968 deaths
Istanbul University Faculty of Law alumni
University of Paris alumni
Prime Ministers of Iraq
Presidents of the Chamber of Deputies of Iraq
Governors of the Central Bank of Iraq
People from Baghdad
Iraqi prisoners sentenced to life imprisonment
Prisoners sentenced to life imprisonment by Iraq
Recipients of Iraqi presidential pardons
Members of Iraqi Academy of Sciences